Netechmodes is a genus of moths belonging to the family Tortricidae.

Species
Netechmodes gravidarmata Razowski & Wojtusiak, 2009
Netechmodes harpago Razowski & Pelz, 2003
Netechmodes landryi Razowski, 2004

See also
List of Tortricidae genera

References

 , 2005: World catalogue of insects volume 5 Tortricidae.
 , 2003, Boll. Zool. agr. Bachic. (2) 35 (1): 17.
 , 2009: Tortricidae (Lepidoptera) from the mountains of Ecuador and remarks on their geographical distribution. Part IV. Eastern Cordillera. Acta Zoologica Cracoviensia 51B (1-2): 119–187. doi:10.3409/azc.52b_1-2.119-187. Full article: .

External links
tortricidae.com

Euliini
Tortricidae genera